The 2012–13 Nevada Wolf Pack men's basketball team represented the University of Nevada, Reno during the 2012–13 NCAA Division I men's basketball season. The Wolf Pack, led by fourth year head coach David Carter, played their home games at the Lawlor Events Center and were new members of the Mountain West Conference. They finish with a record of 12–19 overall, 3–13 in Mountain West play to finish in last place. They lost in the first round of the Mountain West tournament to Wyoming.

Roster

Schedule

|-
!colspan=9| Exhibition

|-
!colspan=9| Regular season

|-
!colspan=9| 2013 Mountain West Conference men's basketball tournament

References

Nevada Wolf Pack men's basketball seasons
Nevada
Nevada Wolf Pack men's bask
Nevada Wolf Pack men's bask